The Hawaii Defense Volunteers was a predominantly Chinese-American militia in Hawaii and one of three in Honolulu during World War II. The militia also had Filipinos, Hawaiians, Puerto Ricans, Koreans, and Whites.

See also
Hawaii Territorial Guard

References

Chinese-American culture in Hawaii
Military in Hawaii
Paramilitary organizations based in Hawaii
Chinese-American history
1942 establishments in Hawaii
1945 disestablishments in Hawaii